Adlai E. Stevenson High School is a public high school located in Sterling Heights, Michigan, a suburb of Detroit. Stevenson is a part of Utica Community Schools,  Michigan's second largest school district.

The school was named for Adlai E. Stevenson, a two-time candidate for President of the United States and former United Nations ambassador.  In athletics, the school is often referred to as "Sterling Heights Stevenson". The school's mascot is the "Titans."

School information
As of fall 2012, the school has an enrollment of 2,881, making it the third largest high school in Michigan—when including grades 10-12—and the largest high school in Utica Community Schools.  Stevenson's principal is Kenneth L. Cucchi III and has three assistant principals: Alison Hildebrand, Scott May, and Larry Gray.  The Stevenson MADE Academy's principal is Alison Hildebrand. Stevenson is also a State of Michigan and a National Exemplary Blue Ribbon School of Excellence.

Stevenson High is also home to the Stevenson Manufacturing, Automation, and Design Engineering program (MADE). 

Parts of the school have been renovated including new hallways, and several new classrooms.

Stevenson's newspaper is called "The Vanguard" and its yearbook is called "The Ambassador"; both are Sparty Award winners.

Stevenson High School's motto is "The School of Champions".

As of the 2013–2014 school year, Stevenson had a total enrollment of 1995. Of that, 1718 were white (86.12%), 149 were African American (7.47%), 78 were Asian or Pacific Islander (3.91%), and 33 were Hispanic (1.65%).

Athletics
The Titans are a Division 1 School in the MHSAA and compete in The Macomb Area Conference in lacrosse, competitive cheerleading, football, marching band, baseball, basketball, bowling, cross country, dance team, golf, soccer, softball, swimming, tennis, track, and volleyball.

Football

The Stevenson Titans have one of the best High School Football Programs in the State of Michigan, throughout the program's history it has garnered 47 All-State and 2 All-American Student-Athletes,  winning their Division Championship a total of 15 times, since the addition to a State Playoff beginning in 1975, The Titans have appeared have in the playoffs 22 times and have won 10 Regional Championships, 4 District Championships, and being Runner-Ups in the Division 1 Football State Championship Game 4 times.

The Titans have the most players in the Macomb County to play in the NFL. Notable Professional Football Players who graduated from Stevenson are Frank Zombo, Carl Davis, Pete Chryplewicz, Dan Jilek, Chris Liwienski, and Jim Szymanski.

The Titans have one of the Fiercest Football Rivalries in the State with Eisenhower High School dating back to 1972 and played annually since 1980. The Eagles lead the Rivalry 26–24.

Baseball

The Titans also have one of the best High School Baseball Programs in the State. Under Head Coach Joe Emanuele, the Titans won the 2005 Division 1 Baseball State Championship, and also garnered 3 Final Four appearances, 6 Regional Championships, 12 District Championships, and 12 Division Championships.

Competitive Cheerleading

The Titans Competitive Cheerleading Team won the 2018 MHSAA Division 1 Competitive Cheerleading Championship.

Dance Team

The Titans Dance Team has one of the best Varsity Dance Teams in the Nation, in the last 7 consecutive years placing in the UDA National Dance Team Championship within the top-12 with their highest place being 2nd in 2017.

NHL Professional Hockey players Derian and Kevin Hatcher both hail from Stevenson.

References

External links
Stevenson High School website
 https://www.astihosted.com/UCSDCP/DesktopDefault.aspx?tabid=334

Public high schools in Michigan
Educational institutions established in 1967
Schools in Macomb County, Michigan
1967 establishments in Michigan
Sterling Heights, Michigan